The South American Championships in Athletics is an athletics event which began in 1919. Records set by athletes who are representing one of the CONSUDATLE's member states.

Men's records

Women's records

Mixed records

Records in defunct events

Men's events

Women's events

ht = hand timing

A = affected by altitude

See also
List of South American records in athletics

References

External links

South American Championships
Records
South American Championships